10/3 may refer to:
October 3 (month-day date notation)
March 10 (day-month date notation)
10 shillings and 3 pence in UK predecimal currency
The decagram

See also
 103 (disambiguation)
 3/10 (disambiguation)